Aija Anna-Maija Pauliina Salo (born 27 September 1977) is a chief inspector in the office of the equality commissioner in the Government of Finland. She worked as the secretary general of Seta from 2005 to 2015.

Life 
She was on the board of the University of Helsinki student union in 2001.

In 2007–2008, she was on leave from Seta, and worked as a policy expert for ILGA-Europe (International Lesbian, Gay, Bisexual, Transgender and Intersex Association Europe) in Brussels. 
Previously, Salo has worked as the general secretary of the Union of Women's Affairs and campaign informant for Vihreiden Naisten. Salo lives in Espoo. She has a master's degree in political science, majoring in sociology.

From 2007 to 2009, Salo was a member of the Green party delegation, and from 2009 to 2011, was a deputy member. Salo was a candidate in the 2007 parliamentary elections in Uusimaa, but with 1,709 votes, she received were not enough for a parliamentary seat.

References 

Living people
1977 births
Finnish political activists